

Eugene Perry Hamm Jr. (1923 – December 10, 2016) was an American professional golfer and golf course designer.

Hamm grew up in Raleigh, North Carolina and started his golf career as a caddy at the Raleigh Golf Association.  He joined the U.S. Navy in 1943.  Following World War II, he was employed at several golf clubs in the 1940s and early 1950s. These included New Bern Country Club in New Bern, North Carolina, in Pinehurst, North Carolina and in Mt. Airy, North Carolina.  In 1954, he became a member of the PGA of America. Hamm qualified for the 1958 PGA Championship and 1960 U.S. Open. He won the 1966 North Carolina Open.

Hamm is best known as a golf course designer of courses in North Carolina, South Carolina, Virginia, Tennessee, and New York.  Since designing his first 9-hole course in 1949, he has designed and oversaw the building of over 60 courses. In 1955, Hamm helped build the Duke University Golf Course in Durham, North Carolina, with Robert Trent Jones. He moved to Delaware to continue work with Jones, and then in 1959 moved back to Raleigh where he began his own design career. Many of his notable courses are located in Myrtle Beach, South Carolina.

Hamm died in 2016 at the age of 93.

Professional wins
this list may be incomplete
1966 North Carolina Open
1977 Carolinas PGA Senior Open
1978 Carolinas PGA Senior Open

Golf course designs
 1958: Cedars Country Club, Chatham, Virginia https://golf-info-guide.com/courses/virginia/chatham/cedars-country-club.html
 1959: Lynrock Golf Club, Eden, North Carolina
 1966: Meadowbrook Country Club, Garner, North Carolina; listed on the National Register of Historic Places in 2009.
 1967, 1972: North Ridge Country Club, Raleigh, North Carolina
 1971: Pineland Country Club, Mullins, South Carolina
 1985: Lochmere Golf Club, Cary, North Carolina
 1989: Beacon Ridge, Seven Lakes, North Carolina

References

External links
List of Gene Hamm designed courses

American male golfers
Golf course architects
Golfers from Raleigh, North Carolina
Place of death missing
People from Henderson, North Carolina
1923 births
2016 deaths